The Centre for Computing History is a museum in Cambridge, England, established to create a permanent public exhibition telling the story of the Information Age.

Overview
The museum acts as a repository for vintage computers and related artefacts. The museum is open Wednesdays through to Sundays from 10am to 5pm in term time and 7 days a week during school holidays. On display are key items from the early era of computers (and even before) from ageing comptometers through the Altair 8800 to the ZX Spectrum and Apple II series. The museum also holds vintage games consoles, peripherals, software and an extensive collection of computer manuals, magazines and other literature. It is home to the Megaprocessor, an enormous version of a computer chip designed by James Newman.

History and status
The centre is a registered educational charity. It is funded by a combination of sponsors from local businesses and private individuals. Venture capitalist and entrepreneur Hermann Hauser was involved with funding discussions. He became patron of the museum in December 2011, 30 years after the launch of the BBC Micro. The museum is run by a board of trustees chaired by Gareth Marlow.

The Centre moved to a  site in Rene Court, off Coldham's Lane in the east side of Cambridge in summer 2013. The museum was originally located in Haverhill, Suffolk. Plans to relocate the museum to Cambridge, led to a report in October 2011 that negotiations were underway for a site. The museum was informed in June 2012 that planning permission for the new Cambridge site had been granted, subject to complying with current building regulations.

In March 2019, the museum was granted Accredited Museum status by Arts Council England (ACE). The Accreditation Scheme sets out nationally agreed standards, which inspire the confidence of the public and funding and governing bodies. It enables museums to assess their current performance, as well as supporting them to plan and develop their services.

Activities

The Centre for Computing History runs regular educational activities for schools and the general public. These range from programming workshops using 1980s BBC Micros to gaming tours to coding using software like Scratch for the Raspberry Pi.

The centre also loans artefacts for film and TV productions and has helped with props and sets for The IT Crowd, Brits Who Made the Modern World on Channel Five with Peter Snow and in April 2009 produced the Gadget Hall of Fame stand at The Gadget Show Live exhibition at the NEC in Birmingham. In December 2018, the centre was involved in a groundbreaking interactive Netflix episode of Black Mirror called Bandersnatch.

The centre collects and preserves historical computing related artefacts and has undertaken a project to preserve the data from the BBC Domesday Project and make it available online. They already have data from both the National Disk and Community Disk online and are currently investigating copyright issues before releasing the URL to the general public. The centre's oldest working machine is their Elliott 903, which is regularly demonstrated; other important artefacts in the centre's collection include a prototype ZX Spectrum, Professor Steve Furber's Computer Group prototype and a NeXT computer signed by Sir Tim Berners-Lee.

In June 2017, some of the centre's volunteers received recognition for their contributions to the museum at the annual SHARE Museums East Volunteer Awards.

In October 2018, the centre received lottery funding for a project on LEO computers, in partnership with the LEO Computers Society. The project, Swiss Rolls, Tea and the Electronic Office: A History of LEO, the First Business Computer, aims to bring together, preserve, archive and digitise a range of LEO Computers artefacts, documents and personal memories to share the largely unknown story of LEO with a new audience. The project includes plans to develop a virtual reality replica of the LEO I.

The centre was awarded an Object of The Year award from 'Museums in Cambridgeshire' in November 2019 for their Sinclair ZX Spectrum prototype, donated earlier that year from a company that had worked on it during its development.

With their extensive collection of over 13,000 video games, the centre also has a leading video game preservation initiative, and information for every object in the museum collection is accessible via the online catalogue. As part of preservation, they digitally archive source code for games such as the Magic Knight series by David Jones (programmer), and preserve and host scans of original sketches and other development materials from game companies such as Guerrilla Games. Their work emphasises the importance of preserving all aspects of the experience of a game, from marketing materials to the copy protection experience, packaging, and hardware. The centre's collection also hosts uncommon hardware and operating systems with this in mind. They are also working with current video game developers and publishers, acting as a repository for their ongoing work so that it is actively preserved.

References

External links

 The Centre for Computing History website
 Inside a museum with byte and big dreams, East Anglian Daily Times, 3 Jun 2008 
 Haverhill's Computer Museum to feature on TV, Haverhill-UK, 20 Aug 2008 
 Haverhill's Centre for Computing History opens 13 and 14 September, Haverhill-UK, 2 Sep 2008 
 Play vintage computer games, Haverhill Echo, 11 Sep 2008 
 Museum tells story behind every screen, Cambridge Evening News, 29 Sep 2008 
 Museum props up set for hit comedy, Cambridge Evening News, 30 Dec 2008 
 Gadget Show Live — Huge success for Haverhill, Haverhill-UK, 23 Apr 2009 
 Gadget Hall of Fame: which did you own?, MSN Tech & Gadgets, 28 Apr 2009 
 BBC date for computing centre curator, Haverhill Echo, 8 Oct 2009 
 Museum-piece computers programmed into TV show, Haverhill Weekly News, 8 Oct 2009 
 Giant £40,000 megaprocessor on display in Cambridge, Cambridge Evening News, 28 Nov 2016 
 Guinness World Record for Cambridge's MegaProcessor, Cambridge Evening News, 14 Apr 2017 
 Cambridge museum celebrates history of women in computing, BBC News Cambridgeshire, 14 Oct 2017 

2008 establishments in England
Charities based in Cambridgeshire
Computer museums
Computer museums in the United Kingdom
Museums established in 2008
Museums in Cambridge
Science and technology in Cambridgeshire